Sawantwadi is a town in Sindhudurg district of Maharashtra, India.

It may also refer to:

Sawantwadi, Mawal, a village in Mawal taluka, Pune district, Maharashtra
Sawantwadi taluka, a taluka (a unit of administration) in the Sindhudurg district in the Indian state of Maharashtra
Sawantwadi State, state ruled by the Savant Bhonsale dynasty during the British Raj.
Sawantwadi (Vidhan Sabha constituency), one of the Vidhan Sabha (legislative assembly) constituencies of Maharashtra state in western India
Sawantwadi Palace, a royal palace in Sawantwadi
Sawantwadi Road railway station, a train station on the Konkan Railway
Sawantwadi toys, hand made works of art made of wood in Sawantwadi, Sindhudurg district, Maharashtra, India